The 1983–84 Canada men's national ice hockey team represented Canada at the 1984 Winter Olympics held in Sarajevo, Yugoslavia.

Canada's team qualified for the medal round, but lost by the score of 4–0 to both the Soviet Union and Czechoslovakia to place fourth in the Olympic tournament.

1984 Winter Olympics roster
'Head coach: Dave King
Warren Anderson
Robin Bartel
Russ Courtnall
Jean-Jacques Daigneault
Kevin Dineen
Dave Donnelly
Bruce Driver
Darren Eliot
Patrick Flatley
Dave Gagner
Mario Gosselin
Vaughn Karpan
Doug Lidster
Darren Lowe
Kirk Muller
James Patrick
Craig Redmond
Dave Tippett (C)
Carey Wilson
Dan Wood

See also
 Canada men's national ice hockey team
 Ice hockey at the 1984 Winter Olympics
 Ice hockey at the Olympic Games
 List of Canadian national ice hockey team rosters

References

 
Canada men's national ice hockey team seasons